BPS CS22892-0052 (Sneden's Star) is an old population II star located at a distance of 4.7 kpc in the galactic halo. It belongs to a class of ultra-metal-poor stars (Metallicity [Fe/H]=-3.1), specifically the very rare subclass of neutron-capture (r-process) enhanced stars. It was discovered by Tim C. Beers and collaborators with the Curtis Schmidt telescope at the Cerro Tololo Inter-American Observatory in Chile. Extended high-resolution spectroscopic observations since around 1995 (with Chris Sneden from the University of Texas at Austin as the leading observer) allowed observers to determine the abundances of 53 chemical elements in this star, as of December 2005 only second in number to the Sun.

From barium (Z=56) on, all elements show the pattern of the r-process contribution to the abundances of the elements in the Solar System.
Comparing the observed abundances for a stable element such as europium (Z=63) and the radioactive element thorium (Z=90) to calculated abundances of an r-process in a type II supernova explosion (as from the universities at Mainz and Basel groups of Karl-Ludwig Kratz and Friedrich-Karl Thielemann) have allowed observers to determine the age of this star to be about 13 billion years. Similar ages have been derived for other ultra-metal-poor stars (CS31082-001, BD+17°3248 and HE 1523-0901) from thorium-to-uranium ratios.

References

Sources
 Beers T.C., Preston G.W., Shectman S.A.,  A search for stars of very low metal abundance. I., Astron. J., 90, 2089-2102 (1985)
 Beers T.C., Preston G.W., Shectman S.A.,  A search for stars of very low metal abundance. II.,  Astron. J., 103, 1987-2034 (1992)
 Kratz, Karl-Ludwig; Bitouzet, Jean-Philippe; Thielemann, Friedrich-Karl; Moeller, Peter; Pfeiffer, Bernd, Isotopic r-process abundances and nuclear structure far from stability - Implications for the r-process mechanism, Astrophysical Journal, vol. 403, no. 1, p. 216-238 (1993)
 Sneden, Christopher; McWilliam, Andrew; Preston, George W.; Cowan, John J.; Burris, Debra L.; Armosky, Bradley J., The Ultra--Metal-poor, Neutron-Capture--rich Giant Star CS 22892-052, Astrophysical Journal v.467, p. 819 (1996)
 Cowan, John J.; Pfeiffer, B.; Kratz, K.-L.; Thielemann, F.-K.; Sneden, Christopher; Burles, Scott; Tytler, David; Beers, Timothy C., R-Process Abundances and Chronometers in Metal-poor Stars The Astrophysical Journal, Volume 521, Issue 1, pp. 194–205 (1999)

External links
 R-Process Cosmo-Chronometers
 image
 Image Sneden's Star

K-type bright giants
Asymptotic-giant-branch stars
Population II stars
Aquarius (constellation)